The canton of Artix et Pays de Soubestre is an administrative division of the Pyrénées-Atlantiques department, southwestern France. It was created at the French canton reorganisation which came into effect in March 2015. Its seat is in Artix.

It consists of the following communes:
 
Argagnon
Arget
Arnos
Arthez-de-Béarn
Artix
Arzacq-Arraziguet
Aussevielle
Balansun
Beyrie-en-Béarn
Bonnut
Bougarber
Bouillon
Boumourt
Cabidos
Casteide-Cami
Casteide-Candau
Castétis
Castillon
Cescau
Coublucq
Denguin
Doazon
Fichous-Riumayou
Garos
Géus-d'Arzacq
Hagetaubin
Labastide-Cézéracq
Labastide-Monréjeau
Labeyrie
Lacadée
Lacq
Larreule
Lonçon
Louvigny
Malaussanne
Mazerolles
Méracq
Mesplède
Mialos
Momas
Mont
Montagut
Morlanne
Piets-Plasence-Moustrou
Pomps
Poursiugues-Boucoue
Saint-Médard
Sallespisse
Sault-de-Navailles
Séby
Serres-Sainte-Marie
Urdès
Uzan
Viellenave-d'Arthez
Vignes

References

Cantons of Pyrénées-Atlantiques